Thomas Arthur Bellew (1820 – 24 July 1863) was an Irish landowner and politician.

Bellew was the son of Sir Michael Bellew, 1st Baronet (see Grattan-Bellew Baronets), and Helena Maria Dillon. He married Pauline Grattan, daughter of Henry Grattan, in September 1858. The family resided at Mountbellew, County Galway.

Between 1852 and 1857, he was Member of Parliament (MP) for County Galway.

References
 thepeerage.com

External links 

1820 births
1863 deaths
Members of the Parliament of the United Kingdom for County Galway constituencies (1801–1922)
Politicians from County Galway
UK MPs 1852–1857
19th-century Irish people
Younger sons of baronets